Aricoma (possibly from in the Aymara spelling Ariquma for a variety of tuber (Smallanthus sonchifolius),) is a mountain in the Andes of Peru, about  high. It is located in the Puno Region, Carabaya Province, Crucero District, and in the Sandia Province, Limbani District. The mountain lies east of Aricoma Lake and northwest of Jalahuana.

References 

Mountains of Puno Region
Mountains of Peru